Thalakulam  is a village situated on Kanniyakumari district in the Indian state of Tamil Nadu. Padmanabhapuram , Karungal, Nagercoil and Thirunainar kurichi are the nearby Cities to Thalakulam.The village is the birthplace of Velu Thampi Dalawa

Demographics
Both Tamil and Malayalam speaking people are living here.

Educational institution
Bishop Agniswamy College Of Education
Athithiya Matric H.S.S
Govt High School Thalakulam

Police Stations near Thalakulam
Eraniel Police Station 
Mondaikadu Police Station 
Manavalakurichi Police Station

References

Cities and towns in Kanyakumari district